Buddhism in Morocco is a small religious minority in the kingdom of Morocco. Estimates for the number of Buddhists in Morocco range from a few dozen, to under 0.01% of the population (or about 3000 people). The Pew Forum estimates that about 0.1% of Morocco's population is Buddhist.

The vast majority of the Buddhists in Morocco are foreigners, especially from Vietnam, Indonesia and Cambodia. There are Buddhist holy shrines in Rabat and Casablanca.

References 

Morocco
Religion in Morocco
Buddhism in Africa